During the Russian invasion of Ukraine, Russia occupied vast portions of the territory of Ukraine, having already occupied parts of the Donetsk and Luhansk oblasts as well as the entire Autonomous Republic of Crimea since the beginning of the Russia-Ukraine war in 2014. Partisan groups began to be organized in mid-2022. These groups have been involved in intelligence-gathering, sabotage, and assassinations. Much of their activity has taken place in the Kherson and Zaporizhzhia regions.

Timeline

2022

March
On 1 March, the mayor of Kreminna, Volodymyr Struk was abducted from his home. His wife claimed that unknown camouflaged men entered their property and kidnapped her husband. On 2 March, Struk was found shot dead with a gunshot wound in his chest. Anton Herashchenko, an advisor to the Ministry of Internal Affairs of Ukraine claimed that Struk was killed by ″unknown patriots″, suggesting that locals are responsible for his abduction and assassination. Struk was known to be an important pro-Russia figure in the region with ″money and support from the Russian Federation″, who had already expressed support for Russian proxy-forces back in 2014. Before his death, Struk called on local authorities to communicate and collaborate with approaching Russian forces. 

On 20 March, two unknown assailants shot and killed the assistant to Volodymyr Saldo, Vladimir Slobodchikov, in his car outside Saldo’s house in Kherson.

April
On 20 April, pro-Russian blogger Valery Kuleshov was shot and killed while in his car in Kherson.

On 21 April, on a television interview, the mayor of Russian-occupied Melitopol, Ivan Fedorov, said that, according to Ukrainian intelligence, Ukrainian partisans had killed 100 Russian soldiers in the city, primarily Russian police patrols and mostly through ambushes at night. Fedorov also claimed that the Russian army was struggling to deal with these partisans, as the majority of the population of Melitopol was against the Russian presence.

On 21 April, Ukrayinski Novini reported that partisans in occupied Kherson had left a banner with a message on a pole in the city, which said: "Russian occupier and everyone who supports their regime. We are close - we are already working in Kherson. Death awaits you all! Kherson is Ukraine!".

On 26 April, the Governor of Mykolaiv Oblast, Vitaliy Kim, said that there had been resistance against the Russian army in the Kherson Oblast for two months and that Ukrainian partisans had killed 80 Russian troops in the region.

On 28 April, 24 Kanal reported that partisans in occupied Nova Kakhovka had left a banner with a message on a pole in the city. It said as follows: "Russian occupier! Know! Kakhovka is Ukraine! We are close! Our people are already working here! Death awaits you! Kakhovka is Ukraine!".

On 28 April, Apostrophe reported that guerillas blew up the railway bridge in Akimovka.

On 30 April, members of the so-called Berdiansk Partisan Army (BPA) posted a video on Telegram calling for Russian troops to leave Berdiansk. They announced that they were organizing their forces and that they were "ready to come out of the shadows". The account of this organization was used during the invasion for gathering and showing evidence of Russian crimes in the city and information about collaborators with the Russian army in Berdiansk.

May
On 13 May, Oleksii Reznikov, the Minister of Defence of Ukraine, spoke of the defeats and difficulties that Russian troops had been experiencing in Ukraine ever since the start of the invasion. Reznikov also spoke of the partisans in Kherson, Melitopol and other localities, calling them "an important contribution to common victory".

On 22 May, in occupied Enerhodar, Ukrainian partisans detonated an explosive in front of a residential building where the Russian-appointed mayor of the city Andrei Shevchik was located. Shevchik and his bodyguards sustained injuries of varying severity, and Shevchik ended up in intensive care. He was first taken to a hospital in Enerhodar and then to another in Melitopol.

In late May, six Russian border guards at the Zernovo border checkpoint in northern Ukraine were reportedly killed on the week of 30 May–5 June when they were attacked by Ukrainian partisans. Two days later, a bomb exploded near the office of Yevhen Balytskyi, a pro-Russian official and de facto mayor of Melitopol.

June

On 18 June, an explosive device went off in the car of Yevgeny Sobolev, the head of the Kherson Region penal service. He survived the blast and was taken to a hospital according to TASS.

On 20 June, three Russian soldiers were at a waterfront cafe in Kherson when a shooter opened fire at them. Two of the soldiers were killed, while the surviving soldier was hospitalised, according to Ukrainian Southern Command.

On 24 June, in occupied Kherson, a Russian appointed official, Dmitry Savluchenko, was killed by a car bomb, reportedly placed by Ukrainian partisans.

July
On 7 July police officer Serhii Tomko who had defected to the Russian side was shot and killed in his vehicle in Nova Kakhovka.

On 11 July, Yevgeny Yunakov, the Russian-appointed administrator of Velykyi Burluk was killed by a car bomb according to TASS.

On 24 July, partisans in Melitopol attacked rail infrastructure during the night, causing moderate damage to a section of railway. Explosions were reportedly heard near the Melitopol Airfield and near the village of Kostyantynivka, according to the mayor of Melitopol Ivan Fedorov.

On 26 July, Euromaidan Press reported that the Satelit factory in Mariupol had been attacked by partisans and "has been burning for 10 days".

On 27 July, in occupied Kherson an improvised explosive blew up a car with two defecting police officers inside of it, both were severely injured and one later died from his wounds.

On 28 July, The Daily Telegraph reported that posters with the message "Can't leave? HIMARS will help you" had begun appearing in Kherson.

On 29 July, partisans in Luhansk Oblast burned a distribution box controlling the railway traffic lights, junctions and crossings near Svatove during the night, according to the head of the Luhansk Regional Military-Civil Administration, Serhiy Haidai.
Also on 29 July, Petro Andriushchenko, the Advisor to the Mayor of Mariupol, reported that partisans had set grain fields near the city on fire so that Russian forces would not be able to steal and export the grain.

August
On 6 August, Ukrainian media reported that the deputy head of the Russian administration in Nova Kakhovka, Vitaly Guru, was shot dead in his home; this was however refuted.

On 15 August, mayor of Melitopol reported that guerillas blew up the railway bridge which was used by Russians near the city.

On 23 August, Ihor Telehin, the deputy head of the internal policy department in Kherson Oblast was injured in a targeted explosion.

On 24 August, the head of the Russian-appointed administration of Mykhailivka in Zaporizhzhia oblast Ivan Sushko was wounded in a car bombing, he was taken to a hospital and died there from his wounds.

On 26 August, Russian-appointed official Oleksandr Koliesnikov, the deputy chief of the Berdiansk traffic police was injured in an explosion. He was taken to hospital with shrapnel wounds, where he died hours later.

On 28 August, People's Deputy of Ukraine Oleksii Kovalov, who according to Ukrainian authorities at the beginning of July had assumed the position of deputy head of the Russian-appointed government of Kherson Oblast, was shot dead in his own home.

On 30 August, partisans reportedly launched attacks on pro-Russian security forces in Kherson city.

September
On 6 September, Russian-installed official Artem Bardin was heavily wounded when his car was blown up in Berdyansk. Russian officials reported that he had lost both of his legs and doctors were "fighting for his life" in the hospital where he was kept. Bardin later died in the hospital.

On 10 September, Luhansk Oblast Governor Serhiy Haidai claimed that Ukrainian partisans had managed to capture parts of Kreminna during the 2022 Ukrainian Kharkiv Oblast counteroffensive.

On 16 September, the Deputy Head of Berdiansk CAA for Housing and Communal Services Oleg Boyko and his wife, Lyudmila Boyko - who was head of the city's election commission for the referendum to join Russia- were killed near their garage in Berdiansk in an apparent assassination.

October–December
On 31 October, Pavlo Ischuk, the Russian-installed First Deputy Mayor of Berdiansk for Foreign Policy and Mass Communications, was seriously injured by a bombing near his house in Berdiansk.

On 4 November, Head of the DPR Denis Pushilin said that Alexander Nikulin, a judge of the Supreme Court of the DPR, was shot and seriously injured in Vuhlehirsk.

On 15 November, Melitopol Mayor Ivan Fedorov stated that Dmitry Trukhin, a former member of the city council and director of 'communal property' suffered serious injuries after a bombing attack on his residence in Melitopol.

On 12 December, Vitaly Bulyuk, First Deputy Head of the Kherson MCA for Economics, Financial and Budgetary Policy, Agriculture, Revenue and Fees, was injured in a car bombing in Skadovsk. His driver was killed.

On 22 December, it was reported that Andrei Shtepa, head of the Russian occupation in the Kakhovka district of Kherson, was assassinated in a car bombing near a Soviet monument in Kakhovka. His driver was also killed.

2023

January–February
On 13 January a car bombing attempting to kill the collaborator in charge of the Russian occupation of Berdiansk, Alexei Kichigin, took place, though he survived. On 16 January following a series of explosions, Ukrainian authorities announced that Kichigin had been killed in the strikes.

On 24 January, local Russian collaborator Valentyna Mamai was targeted in a car bombing in the center of Berdiansk, and later hospitalized.

On 3 February, local Russian collaborator police officer in Enerhodar, and local head of Russian troops, Yevgeny Kuzmin was killed with an improvised explosive device (IED) while he was in his car.

March
On 14 March, local Russian collaborator Ivan Tkach was killed in a car bombing in the center of Melitopol.

See also 
 2022 Belarusian and Russian partisan movement
 2022 protests in Russian-occupied Ukraine
 Collaboration with Russia during the 2022 Russian invasion of Ukraine
 Occupied territories of Ukraine

References

Further reading
 

Resistance movements
Ukrainian
Irregular military
Military operations of the 2022 Russian invasion of Ukraine
Kyiv offensive (2022)
Northeastern Ukraine campaign
Eastern Ukraine offensive
Southern Ukraine campaign
February 2022 events in Ukraine
March 2022 events in Ukraine
April 2022 events in Ukraine
May 2022 events in Ukraine
June 2022 events in Ukraine
July 2022 events in Ukraine
August 2022 events in Ukraine